Al Jihad fil Islam (Eng: The Concept of Jihad in Islam) is a book written by Sayyid Abul Ala Maududi on the subject of jihad in Islam. The book is an English translation of the classic book in jihad, originally written and published in 1927 in the Urdu language.

Background 
A major part of the book deals with the comparative study of the concept of a just war in various theologies. This book covers various important events of World War I in great detail and provides a critical analysis of the conflict and post conflict development of international accords with respect to war.

Edition

Appreciations 
Allama Iqbal read Al Jihad fil Islam and hailed it as the best explication of the concept of jihad in any language.

See also 
 Islamic Way of Life
 Human Rights in Islam
 Towards Understanding Islam
 Qadiani Problem

References

External links 
 Reading Jamaat-e Islami site in Urdu- Al Jihad-fil-Islam-2/ (main language)
 Reading from Google Books- Al Jihad fil Islam

Books by Sayyid Abul Ala Maududi
1927 non-fiction books